A list of notable television presenters (British) or MCs (USA), (Latin America), by country of production:

Albania
Arian Demolli
Leon Menkshi

Argentina

Australia

Belgium

Brazil

Canada

Chile

Colombia

Costa Rica
Maribel Guardia

Cuba
Rosaura Andreu
Lili Estefan
Liz Evora
Niurka Marcos
Raul de Molina

Dominican Republic

El Salvador
Ana Yancy Clavel
Mauricio Funes
Willie Maldonado

France

Germany

Guatemala

Honduras

Hong Kong

Iceland
Hemmi Gunn

India

Italy

Japan

Malaysia

Malta

Mexico

Netherlands
Marijke Amado
Patty Brard
Lou van Burg
Rudi Carrell
Sylvie Meis
Linda de Mol

New Zealand

Perú

Puerto Rico

Romania

Spain

Sri Lanka
Lasantha Wickrematunge

South Korea 
 Kang Ho-dong
 Yoo Jae-suk

United Kingdom

United States

Venezuela

See also 
 List of news presenters

Television presenters